Ak47 (born Alex Keonig on 13 April 1988) is a Swiss hip hop recording artist and the founder of JD Records.

Alex started his career at age 13 when he began penning schoolyard rhymes, and was well known in his hometown as a "rapper". He first began performing with his friends Sevillano & Sine as the group the "A2S Crew".

In November 2011, he released his street clip entitled "Illegal in the Blood". He was involved in a political provocation in (Le Nouvelliste) when he referred to the UDC with the phrase, "...pursuin til' the end of the world, I would put the mother of Freysinger on the tip of a bomb."

In December 2011, he released an album titled "The First Episode."

On 14 December 2011, he released a small clip of the song entitled "Let them Talk, the Jealous Will Lose Weight".

In November 2011 Ak47 launched his own clothing line, called Ak47.

Alex, often known as the originator of the "swag" movement, has been known over the years as one of Sweden's most popular rap artists. He is known for such chart-topping singles as "Faded O's" and "50 Spray Mane".

Discography

Albums 

Ak47
1er Episode
Released : 5 December 2011

External links 
 Official facebook Page of Ak47

Notes and references 

Living people
Ivorian emigrants to Switzerland
Swiss male rappers
1988 births
Place of birth missing (living people)